Antonio Cortón (May 29, 1854 in San Juan – September 6, 1913 in Madrid) was a Puerto Rican writer, journalist and literary critic. He traveled to and from Spain and was a newspaper editor for a Barcelona paper during the Spanish Restoration, after Spain lost Puerto Rico and other colonies in the Spanish–American War. He wrote , and the biography of José de Espronceda, a Spanish poet.

Life and career
Born in San Juan, Puerto Rico on 29 May 1854, Cortón collaborated on newspaper publications such as: La Araña, Don Simplicio, El Progreso, La Razón, El Tribuno and El Buscapié and El Correo de Ultramar, and newspapers in Madrid such as El Globo, Revista Ilustrada and El Imparcial.

In 1879 he moved to Spain with his widowed mother.

In the March 1898 elections he obtained a deputy seat for Guayama and Mayagüez districts in Puerto Rico.  By 1902, he was editor and interim director of the Barcelona edition of  El Liberal and collaborated on La Vanguardia. He died in 1913 in Madrid.

Works
Las Antillas were the islands of Cuba, Puerto Rico, Martinica, Santo Domingo, Haiti, Jamaica, Guadalupe, St. Thomas, and Trinidad.
 
 

 , a biography of José de Espronceda.

References

Bibliography
 
 
 

1854 births
1913 deaths
People from San Juan, Puerto Rico
Puerto Rican writers
Literary critics by nationality